
Li Yang or Yang Li may refer to:

People surnamed Li
 Li Yang (director) (born 1959), Chinese film director
 Li Yang (educator) (born 1969), Chinese educator and founder of Crazy English
 Yang Li (fashion designer) (born 1987), UK-based fashion designer

Sportspeople
 Li Yang (rower) (born 1978), Chinese Olympic rower
 Li Yang (ski jumper) (born 1980), Chinese ski jumper
 Li Yang (boxer) (born 1982), Chinese amateur featherweight boxer
 Li Yang (sport shooter) (born 1985), Chinese sports shooter
 Lee Yang (born 1995), Taiwanese badminton player
 Li Yang, former name of Geng Xiaoshun (born 1990), Chinese footballer
 Li Yang (footballer, born 1997), Chinese male footballer
 Li Yang (footballer, born 1999), Chinese male footballer
 Li Yang (judoka) (born 1993), Chinese judoka

People surnamed Yang
 Li Yang (biologist), American biologist
 Li "Cindy" Yang (born c. 1973), Chinese-American massage parlor owner and Trump fundraiser
 Yang Li (stand-up comedian) (born 1992), Chinese comedian
 Yang Li (footballer) (born 1993), Chinese female footballer

See also
Liyang (disambiguation), for a list of places
 16164 Yangli, minor planet